A trailhead is the point at which a trail begins, where the trail is often intended for hiking, biking, horseback riding, or off-road vehicles. Modern trailheads often contain rest rooms, maps, sign posts and distribution centers for informational brochures about the trail and its features, and parking areas for vehicles and trailers. The United States Access Board states "A trailhead is defined as an outdoor space that is designated by an entity responsible for administering or maintaining a trail to serve as an access point to the trail." The intersection of two trails is a trail junction and does not constitute a trailhead. 

Historically, the cities located at the terminus of major pathways for foot traffic such as the Natchez Trace and the Chisholm Trail were also known as trailheads.

For mountain climbing and hiking, the elevation of the trailhead above sea level is posted to give an idea of how high the mountain is above the average terrain.

References

External links
Trailheads, a crowd-sourced database of trailheads in the United States

Geography terminology
Trails